Douglas Henry McKay  (5 September 1923 – 7 July 2012) was a senior Australian public servant.

Life and career
Doug McKay was born in North Sydney on 5 September 1923, growing up around Tumbarumba then Narrandera in southern New South Wales.

In 1971, McKay was appointed Secretary of the Department of Trade and Industry (Australia).

Between December 1972 and January 1973, McKay was Acting Secretary of the Department of Tourism and Recreation as well as the Department of Secondary Industry. while serving as permanent head of trade department (which had since become the Department of Overseas Trade).

In 1978, he was appointed Secretary of the Department of Primary Industry. Before retiring in 1980, McKay went on extended sick leave.

McKay died in Canberra on 7 July 2012.

Awards
Doug McKay was made a Civil Officer of the Order of the British Empire in January 1966 for his public service.

Notes

References and further reading

1923 births
Australian public servants
2012 deaths
Australian Commanders of the Order of the British Empire
People from Sydney
University of Sydney alumni